"Freaks" is a song by alternative rock group Live, which was released as the second single from their 1997 album, Secret Samadhi.

The song was not released as a single in the US, but still reached #5 on the Billboard Mainstream Rock Tracks chart and #13 on the Modern Rock Tracks chart. The single was included as a bonus disc on some copies of the album Secret Samadhi in Australia.

Music video
The cover art for the single is from the song's music video, which was directed by Paul Cunningham. The video stars British actor Peter Guinness and features Live, dressed in red shirts and tuxedos, performing the song in a club, where the only drink served appears to be milk. Guinness plays a newcomer to the bar who sits drinking black coffee and refuses the attempts of another patron to get him to try the milk. After a scuffle the newcomer tries to leave but is subdued by the other patrons who force him to drink the milk from a champagne bottle.

Chart positions
The song reached #60 on the UK Singles Chart, #80 in The Netherlands and #36 in Australia.

Track listings
All songs written by Live:

Australian CD single
"Freaks" (Radio Edit) – 4:53
"Lakini's Juice" (Live) – 5:04
"Freaks" (Live) – 4:56
"Love My Way" (Live) – 4:22
"Lakini's Juice" (Full On Mix) – 5:11

European 7" single
"Freaks" (Radio Edit) – 4:53
"Love My Way" (Live) – 4:20

European CD single
"Freaks" (Radio Edit) – 4:53
"Lakini's Juice" (Live) – 5:03
"Freaks" (Live) – 4:58
"Love My Way" (Live) – 4:20

Netherlands CD single
"Freaks" (Radio Edit) – 4:53
"Love My Way" (Live) – 4:20

UK CD single 1
"Freaks" (Album Version) – 4:53
"Lakini's Juice" (Live) – 5:03
"Freaks" (Live)" – 4:58

UK CD single 2
"Freaks" (Album Version) – 4:53
"Freaks" (Labor, Labor, Labor Remix) – 6:48
"Love My Way" (Live) – 4:18

References

External links
Music Video for "Freaks" at YouTube

Live (band) songs
1997 singles
Songs written by Ed Kowalczyk
Radioactive Records singles
1997 songs